Albert Fish: In Sin He Found Salvation is a 2007 biographical documentary film directed by John Borowski. The film relates the life story of American serial killer and cannibal Albert Fish. In addition to interviews, period footage and photographs, the film also recreates many of Fish's crimes in numerous reenactment scenes. The film is also Tony Jay's final work, having died seven months prior to its release.

Premise
The film tells the true story of a sadomasochistic cannibal, child molester, and serial killer, who lured children to their deaths in Depression-era New York City. Elderly but still deadly, Fish was inspired by biblical tales as he took the stories of pain, punishment, atonement, and suffering literally as he preyed on victims to torture and sacrifice.

Reception 
“Borowski offers plenty of material in his second docudrama to generate many conversations, raising his work above B-movie gore into the realm of
philosophical discourse.”

"A very well made and well directed examination of one of American history's most unusual and depraved subjects."

References

External links
 
 
 Killer Reviews

2007 films
2000s biographical films
2007 documentary films
American documentary films
Biographical films about serial killers
Films set in the 1920s
Films set in the 1930s
Works about cannibals
Cultural depictions of male serial killers
Cultural depictions of rapists
Cultural depictions of kidnappers
Cultural depictions of American men
Documentary films about capital punishment in the United States
Documentary films about serial killers
2000s English-language films
2000s American films